General elections were held in Dominica on 28 May 1990. The result was a victory for the Dominica Freedom Party, which won 11 of the 21 seats. Voter turnout was 66.6%, the lowest since universal suffrage was introduced in 1951.

Results

References

Dominica
Elections in Dominica
General
Dominica